Qurtlujeh-e Sofla (also Romanized as Qūrtlūjeh-e Soflā) is a village in Garamduz Rural District, Garamduz District, Khoda Afarin County, East Azerbaijan Province, Iran. At the 2006 census, its population was 590, in 119 families.

References 

Populated places in Khoda Afarin County